Matt Horsley (born 9 June 1972 in Wollongong, New South Wales, Australia) is an Australian retired footballer.

Club career
He last played as a right full back for the Australian A-League club Perth Glory in 2005, which he joined in 2001. Horsley had previously captained the Wollongong Wolves, with whom he played from 1990 to 2001. Horsley led the Wolves to victory over Perth in the 2000 NSL Grand Final via a penalty shoot-out, despite missing his penalty shot. In Wollongong's 2001 Grand Final victory over South Melbourne he was awarded the Joe Marston Medal for best onfield. After winning a league titled with Perth Glory in 2003 (their first), he was injured in the final NSL season and missed the 2004 NSL title victory. After leaving Perth Glory in 2005 he has focused on his career as a police officer and playing in the amateur league in Perth for Beechboro Cracovia. Matt Horsley left Cracovia in 2010 and has taken the role of club captain with a developing club Caversham Athletic Football Club in Lockridge, Western Australia..In 2012 Matt Horsley started playing and coaching amateur soccer in Kalgoorlie for the Hannans Celtic soccer club.

Honours

Club
 Wollongong Wolves
 National Soccer League (2): 1999–2000, 2000–01
 Perth Glory
 National Soccer League (1): 2003–04

Individual

 Joe Marston Medal (1): 2001
Horsley earned his first and only test cap (446) playing for the Socceroos against Bulgaria in 2000. The cap was given to him during halftime of the World Cup qualifier in Perth between Australia and Bangladesh on 3 September 2015.

References

External links
 Oz Football profile

1972 births
Living people
Sportspeople from Wollongong
Association football fullbacks
Australian soccer players
Australia international soccer players
A-League Men players
National Soccer League (Australia) players
Perth Glory FC players
Wollongong Wolves FC players